Nampamunuwa is a village in the Western Province in Sri Lanka. The nearest town, Piliyandala, is 3.4 km away.

References
Nampamunuwa entry at tageo.com

Populated places in Western Province, Sri Lanka